Amrutanjan may refer to:

 Amrutanjan (balm), a pain-relieving balm
 Amrutanjan Healthcare, an Indian pharmaceutical company established in 1893